In macroeconomics, an industry is a branch of an economy that produces a closely-related set of raw materials, goods, or services. For example, one might refer to the wood industry or to the insurance industry.

When evaluating a single group or company, its dominant source of revenue is typically used by industry classifications to classify it within a specific industry. For example the International Standard Industrial Classification (ISIC) – used directly or through derived classifications for the official statistics of most countries worldwide – classifies "statistical units" by the "economic activity in which they mainly engage". Industry is then defined as "set of statistical units that are classified into the same ISIC category". However, a single business need not belong just to one industry, such as when a large business (often referred to as a  conglomerate) diversifies across separate industries.

Industries, though associated with specific products, processes, and consumer markets, can evolve over time. One distinct industry (for example,  barrelmaking) may become limited to a tiny niche market and get mostly re-classified into another industry using new techniques. At the same time, entirely new industries may branch off from older ones once a significant market becomes apparent (as the semiconductor industry became distinguished from the wider electronics industry).

Industry classification is valuable for economic analysis because it leads to largely distinct categories with simple relationships. However, more complex cases, such as otherwise different processes yielding similar products, require an element of standardization and prevent any one schema from fitting all possible uses.

Economic theories group industries further into larger categories dubbed economic sectors.

See also
 Outline of industry
 Industry classification
 List of countries by GDP sector composition

References

External links